Arashiyama Jirō (born 14 December 1943 as Jirō Ebi) is a former sumo wrestler from Anpachi, Gifu, Japan. He made his professional debut in March 1960 and reached the top division in March 1970. His highest rank was maegashira 12. He left the sumo world upon retirement from active competition in May 1972.

Career record

See also
Glossary of sumo terms
List of past sumo wrestlers
List of sumo tournament second division champions

References

1943 births
Living people
Japanese sumo wrestlers
Sumo people from Gifu Prefecture